Charles Harington may refer to:

Sir Charles Harington (British Army officer, born 1872) (1872–1940), British Army general
Sir Charles Harington (chemist) (1897–1972), Welsh chemist
Sir Charles Harington (British Army officer, born 1910) (1910–2007), British Army general
Charles Richard Harington (born 1933), Canadian zoologist